Yoshiya (written: 佳也, 栄哉 or 代志也) is a masculine Japanese given name. Notable people with the name include:

 (born 1987), Japanese footballer
 (born 1973), Japanese footballer

Yoshiya (written: 吉屋) is also a Japanese surname. Notable people with the surname include:

 (1650–1668), Japanese poet
 (1896–1973), Japanese writer

See also
7257 Yoshiya, main-belt asteroid
Joshua

Japanese-language surnames
Japanese masculine given names